Jaya Devkota, also sometimes known as Jay Devkota, (born 8 March 1992) is a Nepalese folk singer. Born in Rukum, Devkota started his career in 2006 with the album Jeevan Bhayo Urath Bagara, Devkota has released more than 23 albums and more than 400 songs. His 2018 song "Barkha Lagechha" was nominated for a Sadhana Music Award.

Awards

References 

21st-century Nepalese male singers
Living people
Nepalese folk singers
1992 births